The SNCF Class BB 62400 diesel locomotives were former NS    locomotives purchased by the SNCF between 1990–1992. They were retired by the French railway on December 19, 2007.

References

62400
Standard gauge locomotives of France
Standard gauge locomotives of the Netherlands
BB 62400

Freight locomotives